Michał Szpakowski (born 23 April 1989) is a Polish rower.  He is the reigning world champion in the men's coxless four won at the 2019 World Rowing Championships. He competed in the Men's eight event at the 2012 Summer Olympics.

References

External links

1989 births
Living people
Polish male rowers
Olympic rowers of Poland
Rowers at the 2012 Summer Olympics
Rowers at the 2016 Summer Olympics
Sportspeople from Toruń
World Rowing Championships medalists for Poland
Rowers at the 2020 Summer Olympics
21st-century Polish people